PKIoverheid is the public key infrastructure (PKI) from the Dutch government. Like any other PKI, the system issues and manages digital certificates such that they can be realized.

External links 
PKIoverheid.nl
 
Government of the Netherlands
Cryptography